Worser Creek is a stream in Palo Pinto County, Texas, in the United States. The creek flows  to its mouth at Palo Pinto Creek.

See also
List of rivers of Texas

References

Rivers of Palo Pinto County, Texas
Rivers of Texas